Charles Lalemand was a Belgian rower. He competed at the 1920 Summer Olympics in Antwerp with the men's eight where they were eliminated in round one.

References

Date of birth missing
Date of death missing
Belgian male rowers
Olympic rowers of Belgium
Rowers at the 1920 Summer Olympics
European Rowing Championships medalists